The 2020 Southland Conference women's soccer tournament, the postseason women's soccer tournament for the Southland Conference, was held from April 13  to April 17, 2020. The seven-match tournament took place at the Lamar Soccer Complex in Beaumont, Texas. The eight-team single-elimination tournament consisted of three rounds based on seeding from regular season conference play.  The defending champions were the Lamar Lady Cardinals, but they were unable to defend their title falling in the first round to Sam Houston State 4–3.  The Southeastern Lady Lions won the tournament, defeating Sam Houston 3–0 in the final.

Tournament attendance was restricted to 75 per match due to COVID-19 precautions.

Media and TV
All matches were broadcast on ESPN+.

Bracket

Source:

Schedule

Quarterfinals

Semifinals

Final

All-Tournament team

Source: 

MVP in bold

References 

 
Southland Conference Women's Soccer Tournament